The genus Rhynchostruthus is a small group of finches in the family Fringillinae. Commonly known as golden-winged grosbeaks, they are attractive, chunky, medium-sized, robust-billed songbirds restricted to the southern Arabian and northern Somalian regions.

These elusive birds are typically found between 1,060 and 2,800 metres ASL in forested wadis and areas of scrub. The fruits of junipers, acacias and spurges appear to form the bulk of their diet.

Description
These birds have slight sexual dichromatism. Males are grey-brown overall with a black bill, dark mask, white cheeks, and large, bright yellow patches on the wings and tail. The extent of the dark head-pattern and white cheek-patches varies considerably between taxa. The females are similar to the males though somewhat duller, and the juveniles are rather streaky and lack the adults' distinctive head pattern.

Systematics
The large bill suggests a relationship with the Asian grosbeaks - e.g. Mycerobas - but its song and calls are reminiscent of European goldfinch Carduelis carduelis, European greenfinch C. chloris, and Yemen linnet C. yemenensis. Also it has been observed performing a greenfinch-like slow-winged display flight which suggests its true affinities may lie within the genus Carduelis. Altogether, Rhynchostruthus seems to belong to a group of Carduelinae which includes such birds as Carduelis, the oriole finch (Linurgus olivaceus), and the canaries, many of which have large amounts of brilliant yellow plumage. But the exact placement of the golden-winged grosbeaks is not very well resolved. Molecular genetic studies have shown that Rhynchostruthus and Rhodospiza form a distinct clade but are not closely related to any other of the birds commonly referred to as "grosbeaks".

The genus used to contain a single species, Rhynchostruthus socotranus. But more recently this is often split into three:
 Socotra golden-winged grosbeak, Rhynchostruthus socotranus
 Arabian golden-winged grosbeak, Rhynchostruthus percivali
 Somali golden-winged grosbeak, Rhynchostruthus louisae

References

External links
 Socotra Grosbeak photographs. Retrieved 2008-MAY-27.

Finches
Grosbeaks
Taxa named by Philip Sclater